The Pilatus PC-9 is a single-engine, low-wing tandem-seat turboprop training aircraft manufactured by Pilatus Aircraft of Switzerland. Designed as a more powerful evolution of the Pilatus PC-7, the PC-9's first flight was made in May 1984 after which certification was achieved in September 1985. After this, the first production orders for the type were received from the Royal Saudi Air Force, with deliveries commencing in 1985. Since then, more than 250 airframes have been produced across five different variants and the type is employed by a number of military and civilian operators around the world, including the Swiss Air Force, the Croatian Air Force, and the Royal Thai Air Force.

Design and development

The PC-9 is a more powerful evolution of the PC-7. It retains the overall layout of its predecessor, but it has very little structural commonality with it. Amongst other improvements, the PC-9 features a larger cockpit with stepped ejection seats and also has a ventral airbrake.

The PC-9 program officially started in 1982. Although some aerodynamic elements were tested on a PC-7 during 1982 and 1983, the first flight of the first PC-9 prototype took place on 7 May 1984. A second prototype flew on 20 July of the same year; this prototype had all the standard electronic flight instrumentation and environmental control systems installed and was thus almost fully representative of the production version.

Certification was achieved in September 1985. By this time, the PC-9 had lost the Royal Air Force trainer competition to the Short Tucano. However, the marketing links that Pilatus built up with British Aerospace during the competition led to their first order from Saudi Arabia.

, more than 250 aircraft of this type have been built.

Operational history
The first production aircraft for the Royal Australian Air Force (RAAF) flew on 19 May 1987, under the Australian designation PC-9/A.

Condor of Germany uses 10 examples of the target-towing variant.

On 22 March 1991, during Operation Provide Comfort, Capt. Thomas Dietz and Lt. Bob Hehemann were patrolling over Iraqi airspace in F-15C Eagles when they detected two contacts on radar, prompting Dietz and Hehemann to approach to visually identify them. Hehemann pursued a PC-9, while Dietz positioned himself behind and shot down a Sukhoi Su-22. The pilot of the PC-9 saw the explosion and spontaneously ejected, nearly being struck by Hehemann. Hehemann confirmed the chute deployment and pilots’ survival before flying in formation with the empty aircraft until it descended and crashed into the ground a minute and fifty seconds later. Hehemann was awarded with a maneuver kill.

In August 2015, Pilatus received a contract to deliver nine PC-9Ms to the Royal Jordanian Air Force, but in April 2016 changed the order to eight PC-21s. Deliveries were due to start in January 2017 under the original deal.

The United States Army operated three PC-9s from 1991–1996 as chase and test aircraft. They eventually were sold to Slovenia in 1995.

Variants

PC-9
Two-seat basic trainer aircraft.
PC-9/A
 67 two-seat trainers for the Royal Australian Air Force. 2 fully built planes supplied by Pilatus, 17 assembled from kits and 48 built under licence in Australia by Hawker de Havilland.
PC-9B
Two-seat target-towing aircraft for the German Air Force. This target-towing version has an increased fuel capacity enabling flight for up to 3 hours and 20 minutes as well as two Southwest RM-24 winches under the wings. These winches can reel out a target up to 3.5 kilometres.
PC-9M
This version was introduced in 1997 as the new standard model. It has an enlarged dorsal fin in order to improve longitudinal stability, modified wingroot fairings, stall strips on the leading edges as well as new engine and propeller controls. Croatia bought 17 new examples in 1997; Slovenia placed an order for nine (nicknamed Hudournik – "Torrent") in December of the same year; Oman ordered 12 examples in January 1999; and Ireland signed a contract for eight in January 2003. Bulgaria purchased 12 aircraft in 2004. Mexico received at least two in September 2006. The last order was made by Ireland for one attrition replacement aircraft, it was delivered in 2017.
Beech Pilatus PC-9 Mk.2
In order to compete in the United States JPATS competition, Pilatus and Beechcraft developed an extensively modified version of the PC-9, initially called the Beech Pilatus PC-9 Mk. II which won out over seven other contenders. It was later renamed the Beechcraft T-6A Texan II and is now built and marketed independently by Beechcraft. Over 700 are to be built for the United States Air Force and United States Navy, with Pilatus receiving royalties.

Operators

Military operators

 National Air Force of Angola

 Bulgarian Air Force

 Croatian Air Force

 Chadian Air Force

 Irish Air Corps

 Mexican Air Force

 Myanmar Air Force

 Royal Air Force of Oman

 Slovenian Air Force and Air Defence

 Swiss Air Force

 Royal Thai Air Force

 Cyprus Air Command

Former military operators

 Royal Australian Air Force Retired 2019, replaced by the Pilatus PC-21.

 Iraqi Air Force

 United States Army

Surviving aircraft

 A23-001 – RAAF Museum, RAAF Base Point Cook
 A23-009 – gate guardian at RAAF Base Pearce
 A23-020 – Fighter World, RAAF Base Williamtown
 A23-022 – RAAF Base Townsville Aviation Heritage Centre
 A23-028 – Fleet Air Arm Museum, HMAS Albatross
 A23-030 – gate guardian at RAAF Base East Sale
 A23-031 – RAAF Wagga Heritage Centre
 A23-032 – RAAF Wagga Heritage Centre, in storage for eventual display at another location
 A23-036 – gate guardian at RAAF Base East Sale

Specifications (PC-9M)

See also

References

Notes

Bibliography

 Harding, Stephen. U.S. Army Aircraft Since 1947. Atglen, Pennsylvania: Schiffer Publishing Ltd., 1997. .
 Jackson, Paul. Jane's All The World's Aircraft 2003–2004. Coulsdon, UK: Jane's Information Group, 2003. .

External links

 Pilatus PC-9 Image Gallery

PC-09
1980s Swiss military trainer aircraft
Single-engined tractor aircraft
Low-wing aircraft
Single-engined turboprop aircraft
Aircraft first flown in 1984